Fred Børre Lundberg (born 25 December 1969 in Hammerfest and raised in Bardufoss) is a former Nordic combined skier from Bardu, Norway. He dominated the sport in the 1990s, winning both at the FIS Nordic World Ski Championships and at the Winter Olympics.

Lundberg won six medals at the Nordic skiing world championships, including three golds (15 km individual: 1991, 1995; 4 x 5 km team: 1997) and three silvers (3 x 10 km team: 1993, 4 x 5 km team: 1995, and 1999). At the Winter Olympics, he won four medals, including two golds (15 km individual: 1994, 4 x 5 km team 1998) and two silvers (3 x 10 km team: 1992, 1994).

He won the Holmenkollen medal in 1998 (shared with Larissa Lazutina, Alexey Prokurorov, and Harri Kirvesniemi).

Lundberg lives with Marit Bjørgen, an Olympic champion in cross-country skiing, in Holmenkollen, Oslo.

References

External links
 
 Holmenkollen medalists – click Holmenkollmedaljen for downloadable pdf file 

1969 births
Nordic combined skiers at the 1992 Winter Olympics
Nordic combined skiers at the 1994 Winter Olympics
Nordic combined skiers at the 1998 Winter Olympics
Holmenkollen medalists
Living people
Norwegian male Nordic combined skiers
Olympic gold medalists for Norway
Olympic silver medalists for Norway
FIS Nordic Combined World Cup winners
Olympic Nordic combined skiers of Norway
People from Hammerfest
People from Bardu
Olympic medalists in Nordic combined
FIS Nordic World Ski Championships medalists in Nordic combined
Medalists at the 1998 Winter Olympics
Medalists at the 1994 Winter Olympics
Medalists at the 1992 Winter Olympics
Sportspeople from Troms og Finnmark
20th-century Norwegian people